Scorpis is a genus of marine ray-finned fish from the subfamily Scorpidinae of the sea chub family Kyphosidae which are native to the eastern Indian Ocean and the Pacific Ocean.

Species
The currently recognized species in this genus are:

 Scorpis aequipinnis J. Richardson, 1848 (sea sweep)
 Scorpis chilensis Guichenot, 1848
 Scorpis georgiana Valenciennes, 1832 (banded sweep)
 Scorpis lineolata Kner, 1865 (silver sweep)
 Scorpis violacea (F. W. Hutton, 1873) (blue maomao)

References

 
Scorpidinae